Mistress of English Literature (M.E.L.) was a master's degree in English—without ancient, modern, or foreign language requirements—conferred mostly at American women's colleges during the 19th and early 20th centuries.  The acronym also stood for Master of English Literature.  The degree was similar to a Lit. M. or M. Lit. degree.  The term "Mistress," in this context, is the feminine form of "Master." In the era of this degree, both forms were interchangeable depending on the gender of the degree holder.

Variations on the degree, in name and course studies, included Mistress of Polite Literature (M.P.L.)

References 

Master's degrees